The 1967 German Grand Prix was a motor race for both Formula One  and  Formula Two cars held at the Nürburgring on 6 August 1967. It was race 7 of 11 in both the 1967 World Championship of Drivers and the 1967 International Cup for Formula One Manufacturers as well a non-Championship race of the 1967 European Formula Two Championship. The 15-lap race was won by Brabham driver Denny Hulme after he started from second position. His teammate Jack Brabham finished second and Ferrari driver Chris Amon came in third.

There had been some changes to the track in an attempt to slow the cars down as they approached the pit area. However, it was clear that the cars had developed considerably over 12 months, so the changes had very little effect on the lap times.

Report

Entry

A total of 16 F1 cars were entered for the event. As with the 1966 event, there were a field of 10 Formula Two cars. Amongst these F2 cars number of stars of tomorrow including Jacky Ickx and Jo Schlesser in their Matras. Among the field were two wooden-chassis Protos. Apart from the F2 entries, the field was much as usual except for a second Lola-BMW for Hubert Hahne. As this had a 2-litre engine, it was entered as a F1 car.

Qualifying

Jim Clark took pole position for Team Lotus, in their Cosworth DFV powered Lotus 49, averaging a speed of 105.598 mph, around 14.189 mile circuit. Clark was nearly 10 seconds faster than the next driver, Denny Hulme in the Brabham-Repco BT24. Third fastest was set by Ickx in his F2 Matra. As this was a Formula Two car, Ickx would have to start behind the main grid. Therefore, alongside Clark and Hulme on the four car front row was the BRM P115 of Jackie Stewart and Dan Gurney’s Eagle-Weslake T1G.  The second Eagle of McLaren headed up the second row, where he was joined by John Surtees in his Honda RA273 and Jack Brabham in his Brabham-Repco BT24.

Race

Clark converted his pole position into an early lead, while his Team Lotus team-mate Graham Hill was pushed from his grid position of 13th, onto some grass, restarting the back of the field, behind the F2 cars. Clark stayed ahead Hulme and Gurney for the first three laps of the race. On the fourth lap, Clark dramatically slowed, his suspension having buckled, and so ended his race. Hill managed his Lotus up to tenth before mechanical troubles eventually put him out of the race.

Immediately Gurney passed Hulme for the lead, while Brabham was third after McLaren retired with a split oil pipe. Ickx continued to impress. He was now up to fifth, behind Stewart. The Scotsman overtook Brabham, only to encounter transmission problems, and so Ickx moved up to fourth. Shortly after this, the Ferrari of Chris Amon closed up and passed the F2 Matra. By lap 12, Ickx was also out of the race, following the collapse of this front suspension. On the next lap, the universal joint on a driveshaft broke for the race leader, Gurney. Hulme took the lead to win from his team-mate Brabham and fellow Kiwi, Amon. This was the first Championship race since 1962 French Grand Prix without a driver from the United Kingdom on the podium.

Classification

Qualifying results

A pink background indicates a Formula Two entry.
Drivers with an asterisk (*) failed to record an officially registered time as it was not an improvement on their previous best.

Race

Note: The race was run with both Formula One and Formula Two cars running together. Formula Two entrants are denoted by a pink background.

Championship standings after the race 

Drivers' Championship standings

Constructors' Championship standings

 Notes: Only the top five positions are included for both sets of standings.

References

External links 

 

German Grand Prix
German Grand Prix
German Grand Prix